This table displays the top-rated primetime television series of the 1985–86 season as measured by Nielsen Media Research.

See also 
The Final Ratings (All 82 tracked series for the year, listed)

References

1985 in American television
1986 in American television
1985-related lists
1986-related lists
Lists of American television series